This list comprises all players who have participated in at least one league match for the Atlanta Silverbacks from the time the USL began keeping archived records in 2003, until the team's last competitive season in 2008, and from 2011 to present time in the NASL. Players who were on the roster but never played a first team game are not listed; players who appeared for the team in other competitions (US Open Cup, CONCACAF Champions League, etc.) but never actually made an USL appearance are noted at the bottom of the page where appropriate.

A "†" denotes players who only appeared in a single match.
A "*" denotes players who are known to have appeared for the team prior to 2003.

A
  Joseph Afful
  Jon Akin*
  Daniel Alvarez
  Jason Annicchero*
  Dan Antoniuk
  Steve Armas *
  Shaker Asad
  Ali Janadlah

B
  Alex Bahr
  John Ball
  Devlin Barnes
  Danny Barrera
  Kevin Barrow
  Joe Barton
  Josh Barton
  Keith Beach *
  Sylvan Bednar *
  Patrick Beech *
  Milton Blanco
  Matt Bobo
  Josh Bolton
  Jordy Broder
  Gary Brooks
  Roland Bruklis
  Scott Buete
  José Burciaga, Jr.
  SM Burt
  Peter Byaruhanga

C
  Sean Michael Callahan
  Sean Cameron
  Blake Camp
  Danny Care*
  Borfor Carr
  Josh Casarona
  Juan Castillo*
  Christopher Cogan 
 T. Casoya †*
  Greg Chevalier
  Ian Checcio *
  Conor Chinn
  Nico Colaluca
  Judah Cooks
  Junuz Coralic *
  Jon Cox
  Raphael Cox
  Mac Cozier
  Brian Crane *
  Thomas Cudworth *

D
  Yaro Dachniwsky *
  Matt Davenport †*
  Jordan Davis
  Fabian Dawkins
  Antonio De La Torre
  Fred DeGand
  Adilson De Lima
  Ihor Dotsenko *
  Andrew Duran

E
  Matt Elliott*

F
  Paulo Ferreira-Mendes
  Pedro Ferreira-Mendes
  Sean Finn *
  Leslie Fitzpatrick
  Carl Fletcher
  Nelson Fonsecu *
  Chris Fox *

G
  Mike Gailey *
  Liam George
  Jimmy Glenn *
  Philippe Godoy
  Ron Goguen
  Fernando González
  Tally Goode *
  Rivers Guthrie

H
  Duke Hashimoto
  Rafique Hassim
  David Hayes
  Josh Henderson
  Nate Hetherington *
  Matt Horth
  Alvin Hudson
  Maurice Hughes
  Willie Hunt

I
  Ivailo Ilarionov
  Dániel Illyés
 J. Issaur *
  Velko Iotov

J
  Omar Jarun
  Gilbert Jean-Baptiste
  Joao Johanning Mora

K
  Shaun Kalnasy
  Macoumba Kandji
  Grant Kerr
  Zach Kirby
  Chris Klute
  Nathan Knox

L
  Martyn Lancaster
  Matthew Lapish
  Jesse Lasseys †*
   Mark Lavery
  Ryan Leib *
  Andrew Lewis
  Luis Liendo
  Ramón Luna

M
  Chris Mahaffey
  Andreas Maier
  Seth Marks *
  Kohei Matsushita
  Jimmy Maurer
  Ryan McIntosh
  Jason McLaughlin
  Tony McManus
  Shaun McSkimming
  Randy Merkel *
  Machel Millwood
  Byron Mitchell
  Ignace Moleka
  Jerson Monteiro
  Justin Moore
  Chris Mormon *
  Shane Moroney
  Ahmed Mohyeldin *
  Carlos Andres Murriagui Gonzalez
  Travis Marx

N
  Roberto Najarro *
  Joe Nasco
  Alberto Navarro
  Reinaldo Navia
  John Barry Nusum
  Johann Noetzel *
  Guy Norcott *

O
  Ciaran O'Brien
  Dayton O'Brien
  Richard O'Sullivan *
  Matthew O'Toole

P
  Jose Parada
  Carlos Parra
  Nick Pasquarello
  Lucas Paulini
  Aaron Paye
  Pablo Peirano *
  Zachary Peoples
  Mario Pérez
  Brian Piesner
  Alex Pineda Chacón
  Ronald Plute
  Derek Popovich

Q
  John Queeley
  Felipe Quintero
  Gerardo Quiroz Gardona

R
  Mike Randolph
  Zion Renfrum *
  Richie Richmond
  Rilla
  Rodrigo Ríos
  Angel Rivillo Ruiz
  Anthonoy Roberts *
  Patrick Robertson
  Edmundo Rodriguez *
  Joao Rodriguez
  Marlon Rojas
  Kevin Rueda
  Tyler Ruthven

S
  Miguel Saavedra †
  Jerome Samuel *
  Brent Sancho
  Junior Sandoval
  David Santamaria
  Daryl Sattler
  Paul Schneider
  Mattias Schnorf
  Stilian Shishkov *
  Jacenir Silva
  Josh Smith
  Tony Soto *
  Kristopher Stone
  Mo Suri *

T
  Jason Thompson
  Anthony Tokpah
  Ray Tomlin *
  Ansu Toure
  Danilo Turcios
  Kevin Tyburski *

U
  Warren Ukah
 Ushogyi *

V
  Guy Valcourt *
  Walter Valesky
  Attila Vendegh

W
  Ryan Walker *
  James Wall *
  Dame Walters
  Jahbari Willis
  David Winner *
  Anthony Wolfe
  Alex Woods
  Corey Woolfolk
  Lloyd White

Z
  Emsad Zahirovic
  Zawalislam †*

Sources

Atlanta Silverbacks
 
Roster
Association football player non-biographical articles